Jacob Wilson (born March 17, 1990 in Crawfordsville, Indiana) is an American racing driver.

Early life

Wilson began speedway karting in 2003. Between 2003 and 2006, Wilson claimed two championships, along with seven second-place and one third-place finishes in the standings across several World Karting Association divisions.

Sprint Car & Silver Crown Racing

Between 2005 and 2007, Wilson competed in several USAC midget races, with six top-ten finishes over that period.

In 2008, he entered his first USAC Sprint Car and Silver Crown Series races. He claimed his first USAC National Sprint Car win that year at Salem Speedway at the Joe James/Pat O'Connor Memorial Race. His best Silver Crown finish that year was 5th at the Copper World Classic at Phoenix International Raceway.

In 2009 he ran a partial schedule with the USAC National Sprint Car and Silver Crown series, where he finished 21st in sprint car points and 16th in Silver Crown points. In ten races on paved tracks, he recorded three top-five and six top-ten finishes, including a 2nd place sprint car finish at Toledo Speedway and a 3rd place sprint car finish at Salem Speedway.

The 2010 season saw Wilson running a lighter schedule, however he did record a top-ten finish in both USAC sprint car and Silver Crown races.

In 2011, Wilson ran his heaviest schedule thus far, with races in the USAC National Midget Series, Sprint Car, and Silver Crown series, as well as the Must See Racing pavement sprint car series. In eight USAC sprint car and Silver Crown races that year, Wilson had two top-five and seven top-ten finishes.

Between 2012 and 2014, Wilson recorded several wins in winged pavement sprint car series including King of the Wing, Auto Value Super Sprints, and Must See Racing, and finished second in the 2012 Must See Racing point standings. Wilson had an exceptionally good year in 2013 where he claimed three wins with the Must See Racing series and had top-ten finishes in every race he entered but one, where he experienced mechanical issues while running in the top ten at Anderson Speedway.

The 2014 season was the first year Wilson began venturing into dirt racing, entering Silver Crown races at tracks such as the Terre Haute Action Track, Indiana State Fairgrounds, Belleville High Banks, Illinois State Fairgrounds, and Eldora Speedway.

Wilson began the 2015 season in strong form with five top-fives and eight top-tens in his first nine races, primarily on pavement. In the second half of the season, Wilson switched focus to his dirt program, including the addition of several 410 winged sprint car dates.

In 2016, Wilson significantly expanded his schedule on dirt, running numerous sprint car and USAC Silver Crown dates.

Indy Lights

He made his Firestone Indy Lights debut in the series at the Kentucky Speedway on October 2, 2011 driving for Belardi Auto Racing. He started third, but spun on the opening lap. He also raced in the season finale at Las Vegas Motor Speedway where he started tenth and finished fifth. Despite only competing in two races in the 2011 Firestone Indy Lights season, he was voted Most Popular Driver.

Little 500

Wilson won the prestigious PayLess Little 500 at Anderson Speedway back-to-back in 2013 & 2014, and has recorded six top-five and seven top-ten finishes in eleven starts.

Motorsports career results
(key)

Indy Lights

Little 500

World of Outlaws

All Star Circuit of Champions

USAC Silver Crown

USAC Sprint Car

MOWA Sprint Car

Must See Racing

References

External links

Wilson Brothers Racing website

1990 births
Indy Lights drivers
Living people
People from Crawfordsville, Indiana
Racing drivers from Indiana
Belardi Auto Racing drivers
World of Outlaws drivers
USAC Silver Crown Series drivers